Faces in the Crowd is a Chinese drama film directed by Gordon Chan, starring William Chan and Wang Qianyuan. Principal photography began in May 2021 in Shantou, China and it was released in China on 14 April 2023.

Synopsis 
In the year 1931, amidst the political unrest in Shantou, Chen Jiadong reunited with his sworn brother Wang Liwen. As the two of them worked together, they were forced to re-examine each other's identities.

Cast

Main cast
 William Chan as Chen Jiadong
 Wang Qianyuan as Wang Liwen

Supporting cast
 Wang Longzheng as Jiang He
 Wang Zixuan as Zhu Jun
 Qian Bo as
 Tian Xiaojie as 
 Dong Fan as Sai Yun
 Ma Ke 
 Ji Huanbo

Special Appearance
 Yin Zheng as Twelfth Master

Soundtrack

References

External links 
 Faces in the Crowd on Weibo
 Faces in the Crowd on Douban

2023 films
Chinese drama films
Films directed by Gordon Chan
2020s Mandarin-language films